Erkki Jorma Kontio (born August 7, 1953 in Oulu, Finland) is a Finnish Harness racing driver. With more than 11,000 wins, he is the most victorious harness driver in Scandinavia.

Kontio started his career in the late 1960s. Since 2000 he has lived in Sweden. Kontio's daughter Anna-Julia Kontio is a successful Finnish equestrian in Show jumping.

Major racing wins

 Finnish Trotting Derby: 1993, 1994, 1996, 1997, 1999, 2009, 2011
 Finnish Trotting Criterium: 1975, 1992, 1993, 2008, 2010
 The Finlandia Race: 1985, 1986, 2007
 Kuninkuusravit: 2015
 Swedish Trotting Derby: 2008, 2016
 Swedish Trotting Criterium: 2009, 2012, 2015, 2017
 Hugo Åbergs Memorial: 1995
 Åby Stora Pris: 1993, 2001, 2013
 European Trotting Derby: 1992, 2016
 : 2014
 5-year-old European Championship: 1994, 2017
 Grand critérium de vitesse de la Côte d'Azur: 1995, 2008
 Grand Prix du Sud-Ouest: 1996, 2000
 Critérium Continental: 2004
 Gran Premio Tino Triossi: 2001, 2005
 Gran Premio Orsi Mangelli: 2003
 Gran Premio delle Nazioni: 2008, 2009
 Premio Costa Azurra: 1995, 1999
 Grote Prijs der Giganten: 1985, 1986, 1993
 Graf Kalman Hunyady Memorial: 1998, 2000
 Copenhagen Cup: 1992
 Grosser Preis von Bild Hamburg: 1986, 1995

Sources
Jorma Kontio's homepage (in Swedish and Finnish)

External links

Finnish harness racers
1953 births
Living people
Sportspeople from Oulu
Finnish expatriate sportspeople in Sweden